The Ponca are a Native American tribe.

Ponca may also refer to:
Native American
Ponca Tribe of Nebraska
Ponca Tribe of Indians of Oklahoma
Omaha–Ponca language, a Siouan language 

Arkansas
Ponca, Arkansas, an unincorporated community in Newton County

Nebraska
Ponca, Nebraska, county seat of Dixon County
Ponca Creek (Missouri River), a creek in South Dakota and Nebraska
Ponca Fort (c1700-c1865), a Native American fortified village near Niobrara, Nebraska
Ponca Reservation, an Indian Reservation in north-east Nebraska
Ponca State Park, Nebraska
Ponca Township, Dixon County, Nebraska

Oklahoma
Ponca City, Oklahoma
Ponca City Baseball team, Oklahoma 
Ponca City High School, Oklahoma
Ponca City Public Schools, a public school district
Ponca City Regional Airport (PNC), an airport in Oklahoma
Poncan Theatre, a theatre in Ponca City

Other
Ponca Jazz Records, a Norwegian record label founded in 2004

See also
Poncha (disambiguation)
 
 

hr:Ponca